Kate Horn (1826–1896) was a Canadian stage actress and theater director. She was a popular actor and was the managing director of the Theatre Royal, Montréal from 1873 to 1880.

Early life 
Kate Horn was an orphan born in Ireland. Ate age 16, she emigrated to the United States.

Career 
She made her debut on the stage in Charleston, South Carolina under the patronage of actress Sarah H. Timm in 1842. From 1845 until 1852, she was engaged at the Park Theatre in New York, where she had a successful career, performed with stars such as George Clifford Jordan, Annie Walters, Charlotte Saunders Cushman, Edward Loomis Davenport and William Pleater Davidge, and was called “one of the most beautiful women on the stage”.

Horn made her Montreal stage debut on July 14, 1852, playing Mrs. Ormsby Delmaine The Serious Family. From 1852 to 1864, she divided her time between regular tours to the Theatre Royal, Montréal in Canada, where her spouse John Buckland was the manager of the Theatre Royal, and New York, where she was engaged in several different companies.  In 1864, she settled permanently in Montréal, where she was one of the star actors of the Theatre Royal and a respected member of the fashionable society in Montreal.  When her husband died in 1872, she succeeded him as manager of the theatre.  She retired from both management and acting in 1880, but continued to be active in the theatrical life of the city.

Personal life 
Horn married English-born John Buckland in the Spring of 1852 becoming Kate Buckland. The two settled permanently in Montreal in 1864. John predeceased Horn in November 1872; he was 57. Horn lived on Dorchester Street. She fell ill in 1896 and died at Home Hospital. She was buried at St. Patrick's Church in Montreal.

References 

1826 births
1896 deaths
19th-century Canadian actresses
Canadian theatre directors
19th-century American actresses
American stage actresses
Theatre managers and producers
19th-century theatre managers
19th-century businesswomen

Irish emigrants to Canada (before 1923)